The Venerable Peter Claude Young, M.A. (21 July 1916 - 22 August 1987) was Archdeacon of Cornwall from 1965 to 1981.

Young was educated at Exeter School; Exeter College, Oxford;  and Wycliffe Hall, Oxford. After curacies at Ottery St Mary and Stoke Damerel he was Priest in charge at St Bartholomew, Milehouse from 1944 to 1947.  After that he held incumbencies at Highweek then Plymouth. He was a Canon Residentiary at Truro Cathedral from 1965 to 1981.

Notes

20th-century English Anglican priests
Archdeacons of Cornwall
1916 births
1987 deaths
People educated at Exeter School
Alumni of Exeter College, Oxford
Alumni of Wycliffe Hall, Oxford